Al-Jarniyah (Arabic: الجرنية), also written Jurneyyeh, is a town in Raqqa Governorate, Syria. It is the administrative centre of Al-Jarniyah subdistrict in Al-Thawrah District. The population of the town at the 2004 census was 2686.

The town and much of the subdistrict are currently controlled by the Syrian Democratic Forces, following 2 years of ISIL control since 2014.

Syrian Civil War 

The ISIL control of the town was ended in December 2016, when SDF forces cut off and cleared a large part of the Al-Jarniyah Subdistrict.

See also 
 Raqqa offensive (2016–17)

References

External links 

Populated places in al-Thawrah District